Choi Byung-do (born 18 January 1984) is a South Korean football defender.

Career statistics

References

External links

1984 births
Living people
Association football defenders
South Korean footballers
Incheon United FC players
Gimcheon Sangmu FC players
Goyang Zaicro FC players
Ulsan Hyundai Mipo Dockyard FC players
Bucheon FC 1995 players
Seoul E-Land FC players
K League 1 players
Korea National League players
K League 2 players